The 3rd Reserve Division (3. Reserve-Division) was a reserve infantry division of the Imperial German Army in World War I.  It was formed on mobilization in August 1914 from reserve infantry units primarily from Pomerania.  The division served from the beginning of the war until early 1917 on the Eastern Front, after which it was transferred to the Western Front. It was rated a third class division by Allied intelligence.

August 1914 organization

The 3rd Reserve Division's initial wartime organization was as follows:
 5.Reserve-Infanterie-Brigade:
 Pommersches Reserve-Infanterie-Regiment Nr. 2
 Pommersches Reserve-Infanterie-Regiment Nr. 9
 6.Reserve-Infanterie-Brigade:
 Pommersches Reserve-Infanterie-Regiment Nr. 34
 Pommersches Reserve-Infanterie-Regiment Nr. 49
 Reserve-Dragoner-Regiment Nr. 5
 Reserve-Feldartillerie-Regiment Nr. 3
 2.Reserve-Kompanie/Pommersches Pionier-Bataillon Nr. 2

Late World War I organization

Divisions underwent many changes during the war, with regiments moving from division to division, and some being destroyed and rebuilt.  During the war, most divisions became triangular - one infantry brigade with three infantry regiments rather than two infantry brigades of two regiments (a "square division"). The 3rd Reserve Division triangularized in November 1915.  An artillery commander replaced the artillery brigade headquarters, the cavalry was further reduced, the engineer contingent was increased, and a divisional signals command was created. The 3rd Reserve Division's order of battle on March 1, 1918, was as follows:
 5.Reserve-Infanterie-Brigade:
 Füsilier-Regiment Königin Viktoria von Schweden (1. Pommersches) Nr. 34
 Pommersches Reserve-Infanterie-Regiment Nr. 49
 Pommersches Reserve-Infanterie-Regiment Nr. 2
 1.Eskadron/3. Badisches Dragoner-Regiment Prinz Karl Nr. 22
 Artillerie-Kommandeur 73:
 Reserve-Feldartillerie-Regiment Nr. 3
 IV.Bataillon/Reserve-Fußartillerie-Regiment Nr. 14 (from 23.06.1918)
 Stab Pionier-Bataillon Nr. 303:
 2. Reserve-Kompanie/Pommersches Pionier-Bataillon Nr. 2
 2. Reserve-Kompanie/Pionier-Bataillon Nr. 34
 Minenwerfer-Kompanie Nr. 203
 Divisions-Nachrichten-Kommandeur 403

References
 3.Reserve-Division at 1914-18.info
 Hermann Cron et al., Ruhmeshalle unserer alten Armee (Berlin, 1935)
 Günter Wegner, Stellenbesetzung der deutschen Heere 1815–1939, Bd. 1 (Biblio Verlag, Osnabrück, 1993)
 Histories of Two Hundred and Fifty-One Divisions of the German Army which Participated in the War (1914–1918), compiled from records of Intelligence section of the General Staff, American Expeditionary Forces, at General Headquarters, Chaumont, France 1919 (1920)

Notes

Military units and formations established in 1914
1914 establishments in Germany
Infantry divisions of Germany in World War I
Military units and formations disestablished in 1919